Isopentenyl phosphate kinase is an enzyme with systematic name ATP:isopentenyl phosphate phosphotransferase. This enzyme catalyses the following chemical reaction

 ATP + isopentenyl phosphate  ADP + isopentenyl diphosphate

This enzyme takes part in the mevalonate pathway in Archaea.

References

External links 
 

EC 2.7.4